Cochlespirinae was a  subfamily  of predatory sea snails, marine gastropod mollusks, belonging to the family Turridae, commonly named turrids.

It has been raised to the rank of family Cochlespiridae Powell, 1942

Genera 
Genera in the subfamily Cochlespirinae used to include:

Abyssocomitas  Sysoev & Kantor, 1986
Aforia Dall, 1889
Ancistrosyrinx Dall, 1881
Anticomitas Powell, 1942
Antimelatoma Powell, 1942
Antiplanes Dall, 1902
Apiotoma Cossmann, 1889
Carinoturris Bartsch, 1944
Clavosurcula Schepman, 1913
Cochlespira Conrad, 1865
Comitas Finlay, 1926
Fusiturricula Woodring, 1928
Irenosyrinx Dall, 1908
Knefastia Dall, 1919
Leucosyrinx Dall, 1889
Marshallena Finlay, 1926
Megasurcula Casey, 1904
Micropleurotoma Thiele, 1929
Nihonia McNeil, 1961
Paracomitas Powell, 1942
Pyrgospira McLean, 1971
Rectiplanes Bartsch, 1944
Rhodopetoma Bartsch, 1944
Shutonia van der Bijl, 1993
Steiraxis Dall, 1896
Toxicochlespira Sysoev & Kantor, 1990
Vexitomina Powell, 1942

References 

Cochlespiridae